Bluff City Law is an American legal drama television series created by Dean Georgaris and Michael Aguilar that aired on NBC from September 23 to November 25, 2019. In June 2020, the series was canceled after one season.

Premise
Set in Memphis, Tennessee, the series depicts a law firm led by attorney Elijah Strait (played by Jimmy Smits) and his daughter, Sydney. The firm handles controversial civil rights cases. This is Smits' third role portraying a lawyer in an NBC network prime-time series, the previous programs being L.A. Law and Outlaw.

Cast

Main
Jimmy Smits as Elijah Strait, a civil rights lawyer regarded as one of the most accomplished litigators of his generation.
Caitlin McGee as Sydney Strait, Elijah's daughter and a former corporate attorney. She returns to her father's firm despite lingering tensions stemming from her departure three years earlier.
Barry Sloane as Jake Reilly, a senior partner at Strait & Associates.
Michael Luwoye as Anthony Little, a former cop and partner at Strait & Associates. He and Sydney went to law school together. 
Stony Blyden as Emerson Howe, an introverted paralegal working under Elijah. The pilot episode reveals that he is Sydney's half-brother from an affair her father had, who her father has subsequently adopted.  
Jayne Atkinson as Della Rose Bedford, a gay senior partner at Strait & Associates and Elijah's oldest friend and confidant. 
MaameYaa Boafo as Briana Logan, a seasoned paralegal and investigator who mentors Emerson.
Josh Kelly as Robbie Ellis, Sydney's ex-husband and the chief of detectives at the Memphis Police Department

Episodes

Production

Development
On January 10, 2019, it was announced that NBC had given the production a pilot order. The pilot was written by Dean Georgaris who executive produces alongside David Janollari and Michael Aguilar. Production companies involved with the pilot include David Janollari Entertainment and Universal Television. On May 6, 2019, it was announced that the production had been given a series order, together with Sunnyside. A day after that, it was announced that the series would premiere in the fall of 2019 and air on Monday night entry in the 2019–20 television season at 10:00 p.m. The daily newspaper in Memphis, The Commercial Appeal, reported by June that the series would likely be filmed on location in the city, beginning on July 22, for its initial order of 10 episodes. The series premiered on September 23, 2019. On August 8, 2019, NBC ordered six extra scripts, bringing the script order to 16. On October 17, 2019, it was announced that the six extra script order was canceled and the order was reduced back to 10 episodes. On June 15, 2020, NBC officially canceled the series after one season.

Casting
In February 2019, it was announced that Jimmy Smits, Caitlin McGee, Barry Sloane, and Michael Luwoye had been cast in the pilot's lead roles. Alongside the pilot's order announcement, in March 2019 it was reported that Stony Blyden, Jayne Atkinson and MaameYaa Boafo had joined the cast.

Release

Marketing
On May 12, 2019, NBC released the first official trailer for the series.

Reception
The review aggregator website Rotten Tomatoes reported a 38% approval rating with an average rating of 6.62/10, based on 13 reviews. The website's critical consensus reads, "Though Bluff City Law procedural proceedings often feel outdated, fans of Jimmy Smits and Caitlin McGee may find comfort in its familiar beats." Metacritic, which uses a weighted average, assigned a score of 44 out of 100 based on 7 critics, indicating "mixed or average reviews".

Ratings

References

External links

2010s American crime drama television series
2010s American legal television series
2010s American LGBT-related drama television series
2010s American workplace drama television series
2019 American television series debuts
2019 American television series endings
American legal drama television series
English-language television shows
Lesbian-related television shows
NBC original programming
Television series by Universal Television
Television shows set in Tennessee